Viñales is a town in Pinar del Río, Cuba. It may also refer to:

People
Isaac Viñales (born 1993), Spanish motorcycle racer
Maverick Viñales (born 1995), Spanish motorcycle racer
Pablo Pavón Vinales (born 1945), Mexican trade union leader
Kyle Vinales, American basketball player

Places
Viñales Valley, Cuba
Viñales, a village in Bembibre, Spain

See also
Viñals
Vinalesa, Spain